In baseball statistics, games in relief (denoted by GIR)  is the number of games in which a pitcher appears but is not the starting pitcher.

See also
 Relief pitcher

Pitching statistics